Federico Pelizzari (born 14 August 2000) is an Italian para alpine skier who competed at the 2022 Winter Paralympics.

Career
He made his international debut at the 2021 World Para Snow Sports Championships and won a bronze medal in the super combined standing event.

He represented Italy at the 2022 Winter Paralympics and finished in fourth place in the giant slalom standing event.

References 

Living people
2000 births
Sportspeople from Lecco
Italian male alpine skiers
Alpine skiers at the 2022 Winter Paralympics
21st-century Italian people